Dunquin is a Gaeltacht village in west County Kerry, Ireland. Dunquin lies at the most westerly tip of the Dingle Peninsula, overlooking the Blasket Islands. At 10°27'16"W, it is the most westerly settlement of Ireland and of Eurasia, excluding Iceland. Nearby Dunmore Head is the most westerly point of mainland Ireland. The town is linked to Dingle via the R559 regional road. In summer a ferry connects the village with the main island of the Blasket Islands.

There is dramatic cliff scenery, with a view of the Blasket Islands, where Peig Sayers lived. A museum in the village tells the story of the Blaskets and the lives of the people who lived there including the well-known writers of the island, which includes Sayers, Tomás Ó Criomhthain, and Muiris Ó Súilleabháin.  In 1588, when the Spanish Armada returned via Ireland many ships sought shelter in the Blasket Sound — the area between Dún Chaoin and the Islands — and some were wrecked there.  A memorial stands on the cliffs overlooking the site. Dunquin is located on the Dingle Way, which is a 179 km circular walking trail which takes in much of the Dingle peninsula.

The Village 
This documentary film was made during 1967-68 by Paul Hockings and Mark McCarty, shot almost entirely in Dunquin and the Great Blasket. It was the first film to be completed in the style that came to be known as Observational Cinema.

Ryan's Daughter 
Scenes from the 1970 film Ryan's Daughter, based on a screenplay by Robert Bolt and directed by David Lean, were shot at Coumineole Beach and Ceathrú (Caharhoo) in Dunquin.  The town's then-struggling economy was largely revived by the production of this film and subsequent tourism. Its marginal condition beforehand had been documented in the 1968 ethnographic film "The Village".

Scoil Dhún Chaoin 
Scoil Náisiúnta Naomh Gobnait, Dún Chaoin was first opened in 1914. Before that, the school was located across the road in Baile Bhiocáire. During the 1970s Scoil Dhún Chaoin was the subject of a countywide and national campaign which featured protest marches, sit-ins and arrests. A government decision to close the school was strongly opposed by the local community and following almost three years of closure, the school was reopened in 1973.

CAMRA 
It was in Kruger's bar in Dunquin that CAMRA was founded in 1971.

People
 Peig Sayers (1873-1958) Irish language memoirist and seanchaí.
 Cáit Feiritéar (1916-2005) folklorist and seanchaí.
 Folklorist Seosamh Ó Dálaigh.
 Monsignor Pádraig de Brún (1889-1960), Roman Catholic priest and Irish-language scholar.
 Máire Mhac an tSaoi (b. 1922), Irish-language poet. Mhac an tSaoi spent much of her childhood visiting her uncle, Monsignor Padraig de Brún, and chose to use Dún Chaoin's dialect, folksongs, and folklore as the literary basis for her own poetry and poetics. While assigned to the Irish embassy in Madrid shortly after World War II, Mhac an tSaoi discovered the poetry of Federico Garcia Lorca, which inspired her to belatedly introduce Literary modernism into Irish poetry in the Irish-language.
 Muireann Nic Amhlaoibh (b. 1978), award-winning seán-nos singer and performer of Irish traditional music, was born in the Aran Islands, but grew up in Dún Chaoin. She was the lead singer for Danú, and from 2016 on she has been half of the electronica duo Aeons. Nic Amhlaoibh has both performed and recorded Irish language songs from the Dún Chaoin area, including at least one song from Great Blasket Island.

Gallery

See also
 Munster Irish
 List of towns and villages in Ireland

References

External links
 Dún Chaoin Entry on the Irelandscape Web Site

Towns and villages in County Kerry
Gaeltacht places in County Kerry
Gaeltacht towns and villages
Dingle Peninsula